Grace Medicine Flower is a potter, best known for her intricately carved miniature redware and blackware.

Early life and education
Grace Medicine Flower was born in 1938 at Santa Clara Pueblo, New Mexico. She is a member of the famous Tafoya pottery family and the niece of Margaret Tafoya. Her pots from 1968 to 1972 were done in collaboration with her father, Camilio Tafoya, and are signed with both of their names.

Themes
Grace Medicine Flower's work reflects the spiritual beliefs of her ancestors and often features birds, wildlife, and flowers.

Work
Medicine Flower creates her pottery from local clay she digs herself at Santa Clara Pueblo. She dries the clay in the sun and fires the work outside. She uses a knife or nail to carve her designs using the sgraffito style. Her work began in miniatures but has evolved to include larger bowls and jars.

Awards and nominations
Medicine Flower's work has won multiple awards at the Gallup Inter-Tribal Ceremonials.

References

1938 births
Living people
Native American potters
American ceramists
Women potters
Santa Clara Pueblo people
American women ceramists
20th-century Native Americans
21st-century Native Americans
20th-century Native American women
21st-century Native American women
20th-century ceramists
21st-century ceramists